APTS may refer to:
Asia Pacific Theological Seminary, a theological seminary in Baguio City, the Philippines
America's Public Television Stations, an advocacy organization for public television
(3-Aminopropyl)triethoxysilane, a chemical reagent